Chromis crusma, the valaparaiso chromis, is a species of damselfish belonging to the genus Chromis. It can be found in the South-Eastern Pacific Ocean, from Cabo Blanco, Peru to Talcahuano, Chile. It is oviparous, and the males of the species guard and aerate the eggs.

References

crusma
Fish of the Pacific Ocean
Taxa named by Achille Valenciennes
Fish described in 1833